Several ships can be described as the German cruiser Lützow:

 , launched in 1913, battlecruiser which was scuttled after the battle of Jutland
 , launched in 1939, sold incomplete to the Soviet Union
 , launched in 1931 as Deutschland, she was renamed Lützow in 1940 

German Navy ship names